Franz Wolf (born 5 July 1938) is an Austrian sprint canoeist who competed in the early 1960s. He was eliminated in the semifinals of the K-2 1000 m event at the 1960 Summer Olympics in Rome.

References

1938 births
Austrian male canoeists
Canoeists at the 1960 Summer Olympics
Living people
Olympic canoeists of Austria